Shuddhi is Sanskrit for purification. It is a term used to describe a Hindu religious movement aimed at the religious conversion of non-Hindus of Indian origin back to Hinduism.

Shuddhi movement
The socio-political movement, derived from ancient rite of shuddhikaran,<ref>Hindu-Muslim Relations in British India: A Study of Controversy, Conflict, and Communal Movements in Northern India 1923-1928, by G. R. Thursby. Published by BRILL, 1975. . Lame'Page 136.</ref> or purification was started by the Arya Samaj, Shuddhi ayurveda lucky draw Winner 2023 and its founder Swami Dayanand Saraswati and his followers like Swami Shraddhanand, who also worked on the Sangathan consolidation aspect of Hinduism, in North India, especially Punjab in early 1900s, though it gradually spread across India. Shuddhi had a social reform agenda behind its rationale and was aimed at abolishing the practise of untouchability by converting outcasts from other religions to Hinduism and integrating them into the mainstream community by elevating their position, and instilling self-confidence and self-determination in them. The movement strove to reduce the conversions of Hindus to Islam and Christianity, which were underway at the time.

In 1923, Swami Shraddhanand founded the 'Bhartiya Hindu Shuddhi Mahasabha' (Indian Hindu Purification Council) and pushed the agenda of reconversion, which eventually created a flashpoint between Hindus and Muslims as Hindus were the recipients of the violence.. Mahatma Gandhi made a comment on Swami Shraddhananda in an article titled 'Hindu-Muslim-Tensions: Causes and Resistance' in the May 29, 1922 issue of Young India.

Gandhi further wrote Dayanand that "he narrowed one of the most liberal and tolerant religions of the world." Swami responded to Gandhi's article that "If Aryasamaji is true to themselves, then the allegations of Mahatma Gandhi or any other person and  invasions also cannot obstruct the trends of Arya Samaj."  Shraddhanand followingly kept moving towards his goal.

The main point of contention was the reconversion of Malkana Rajputs in western United Province  As a result, the movement became controversial and antagonized the Muslims populace  and also led to the assassination of the leader of the movement, Swami Shraddhanand by a Muslim in 1926. After Swami Shraddhanand died this movement continued.

In the late 1920s, prominent Goan Hindu Brahmins requested Vinayak Maharaj Masurkar, the prelate of a Vaishnava ashram in Masur, Satara district; to actively campaign for the 're-conversion' of Catholic Gaudas to Hinduism. Masurkar accepted, and together with his disciples, subsequently toured Gauda villages singing devotional bhakti songs and performing pujas. These means led a considerable number of Catholic Gaudas to declare willingness to come into the Hindu fold, and a Shuddhi ceremony was carefully prepared. On 23 February 1928, many Catholic Gaudes in Goa were re-converted to Hinduism notwithstanding the opposition of the Church and the Portuguese government. The converts were given Sanskrit Hindu names, but the Portuguese government put impediments in their way to get legal sanction for their new Hindu names. 4851 Catholic Gaudes from Tiswadi, 2174 from Ponda, 250 from Bicholim and 329 from Sattari  were re-converted to Hinduism after nearly 400 years. The total number of the converts to Hinduism was 7815. The existing Hindu Gauda community refused to accept these neo-Hindus back into their fold because their Catholic ancestors had not maintained caste purity, and the neo-Hindus were now alienated by their former Catholic coreligionists. These neo-Hindus developed into a separate endogamous community, and are now referred to as Nav-Hindu Gaudas'' (New Hindu Gaudas).

However, in Northern India this movement faced stiff opposition from Islamic organizations such as the Barelvi movement's Jama'at Raza-e-Mustafa which attempted to counter the efforts of the Shuddhi movement to convert Muslims to Hinduism in British India.

See also

 Shaucha
 Shuddhikaran
 Shuddhikaran ceremony before a Hindu marriage
 Ghar Wapsi

References

Citations

Bibliography

External links 

 

Rituals in Hindu worship
Arya Samaj
Hindu movements
Salvation